The 1987 Bandy World Championship was the 15th Bandy World Championship and was contested between five men's bandy playing nations. The championship was played in Sweden from 31 January – 8 February 1987. Sweden became champions. Soviet Union, for the first time, didn't reach the top two, while Finland managed to reach the final.

Squads

Participants

Premier tour
 31 January
 USA – Sweden 0–12
 Norway – Finland 2–7
 1 February
 Soviet Union – USA 21–1
 Finland – Sweden 2–8
 3 February
 Soviet Union – Finland 2–4
 Norway – Sweden 1–8
 5 February
 USA – Norway 1–4
 Soviet Union – Sweden 2–3
 6 February
 Soviet Union – Norway 8–4
 Finland – USA 10–0

Match for 3rd place
 8 February
 Soviet Union – Norway 11–3

Final
 8 February at Söderstadion, Stockholm
 Sweden – Finland 7–2

References

1987
World Championship
Bandy World Championship
International bandy competitions hosted by Sweden
Bandy World Championship
Bandy World Championship
1980s in Gothenburg
International sports competitions in Gothenburg